Sopheak Phouk (born 6 April 1984) is a Cambodian sprinter who competed at the 2004 Summer Olympics, recording a time of 11.56 in the 100 meter dash, placing him 8th in the first heat.

References

External links
 

1984 births
Cambodian male sprinters
Athletes (track and field) at the 2004 Summer Olympics
Olympic athletes of Cambodia
Living people